M Sakhawat Hossain (born 1 February 1948) is a Bangladeshi author and speaker. He is a former Election Commissioner of Bangladesh (2007-2012), Brigadier general (retired) in the Bangladesh Army. He wrote more than 32 books, and serves as a columnist and freelance commentator on national and international television as a security and defense analyst.

Early life
Hossain was born in Barisal, East Bengal, Dominion of Pakistan on 1 February 1948 in a well known Muslim family of Barisal. He achieved his Secondary School Certificate (SSC) in 1963 from Karachi, Higher Secondary Certificate (HSC) in 1965 from Islamia Science College (Karachi), Pakistan. He passed Command and Staff College Mirpur, Dhaka, Bangladesh in 1979 and obtained symbol PSC.
He graduated from the United States Army Command and General Staff College (USACGSC) 1981–1982. He earned a master's degree in strategic studies from the Quaid-i-Azam University, Mphil Pt-11 with NDC, Bangladesh. He qualified from National Deference College, Pakistan obtained symbol NDC.

Career
Hossain was commissioned in the Pakistan Army in 1966 from PMA, Kakul. He joined the Bangladesh Army in 1972 upon that country's independence. Following the 2006–2008 Bangladeshi political crisis, he was appointed as a commissioner in the Election Commission headed by A. T. M. Shamsul Huda in 2007 and served till 2012.

Command posts
He led an artillery unit and a sector of the Bangladesh Rifles (now Border Guard Bangladesh). He led an artillery brigade and infantry brigade in plains and commanded an infantry brigade in counterinsurgency operation in Chittagong Hill Tracts.

Staff posts 
Hossain served in director roles for Staff Duties, Military Training and Artillery. He served in the Military Operations Directorate as lieutenant colonel.

Other expertise
He served on the Board of Directors of Sonali Bank, the largest commercial bank in Bangladesh for two years. He attended NATO exercise in Germany. He led the first Bangladeshi military delegation to Germany to attend military exercises with the British Army on the Rhine.

Post retirement
He became an individual researcher in national security and defense, a columnist and security analyst.

Author 
As an author he wrote over 300 articles as columnist on national and international issues in local and international newspapers and journals. He was a freelance commentator on issues of security and geo-politics. He was a regular military analyst during the Iraq war. He was a leading strategic and defense analyst, a Bangladeshi commentator on security issues for British Broadcasting Corporation (BBC) for Bengali and English World Service, Tehran Radio and Voice of America (VOA). He wrote more than 20 books in Bangla and English on national and international politics, defense strategy, election etc. His first book dealt with politico-military events of Bangladesh between 1975 and 1981.

Social
Hossain was a member and Committee member of Kurmitola Golf Club, Rotary Club, Dhaka West & RAOWA (Retired Army officers Welfare association) club and IANSA (International Association of Non- proliferation of Small Arms) – Bangladesh chapter.

References

External links
 
 
 
 
 
 

1948 births
Living people
Bangladeshi columnists
Bangladesh Army brigadiers
Bangladeshi male writers
Quaid-i-Azam University alumni
United States Army Command and General Staff College alumni
Election Commissioners of Bangladesh